Tim Wylton (born Timothy Higginson; 27 February 1940) is a British actor best known for his television roles as Stanley Dawkins in My Hero, and Lol Ferris in As Time Goes By.

Career
As a stage actor he appeared in Zeffirelli's noted 1961 Old Vic production of Romeo and Juliet and was a "mainstay" of the Royal Shakespeare Company between 1963 and 1977.

Wylton attended Strathallan School, Perthshire and RADA. He has been acting on British television since 1964, when he made an appearance on The Comedy of Errors. Other early appearances include The Liver Birds, The Sweeney, Maybury, The Dustbinmen, On Giant's Shoulders and Juliet Bravo. Wylton also had a role in the BBC's 1979 adaptation of Henry V, playing the rather lovable Fluellen.

During the 1980s he acted on programmes such as Bergerac, To Serve Them All My Days, Campion, The Citadel and A Bit of a Do (as Rodney Sillitoe). In 1983, he appeared in the film Curse of the Pink Panther. During the 1990s, he starred in All Creatures Great and Small, Agatha Christie's Poirot, Lovejoy, Rumpole of the Bailey, A Touch of Frost, The Darling Buds of May, French & Saunders, Peak Practice, Annie's Bar, Cadfael, C.A.T.S. Eyes and Wycliffe. In 1995, he appeared as Elizabeth Bennet's Uncle Gardner in the adaptation of Pride and Prejudice.

In 1996, he appeared in As Time Goes By as Lol Ferris, and continued this role until 2002.  From 2000, he has appeared in My Hero as Stanley Dawkins. Since 2000, he has appeared in Absolutely Fabulous, Coronation Street, Casualty, Heartbeat and ''The Royal.

He is the father of actor Huw Higginson.

Filmography

Film

Television

References

External links

Tim Wylton (Aveleyman)

1940 births
Living people
Welsh male film actors
Welsh male television actors
People from Wrexham
People educated at Strathallan School
Alumni of RADA
20th-century Welsh male actors
21st-century Welsh male actors